Tom Blankenship (born February 7, 1978) is an American indie rock musician. He is the bass guitar-player for the Louisville, Kentucky band My Morning Jacket.

Equipment 
Fender Precision Bass

References

External links
 

American rock bass guitarists
American male bass guitarists
Living people
My Morning Jacket members
Musicians from Louisville, Kentucky
Oldham County High School alumni
Rock musicians from Kentucky
Guitarists from Kentucky
1978 births
21st-century American bass guitarists